The Ionian Islands were an overseas possession of the Republic of Venice from the mid-14th century until the late 18th century. The conquest of the islands took place gradually. The first to be acquired was Cythera and the neighboring islet of Anticythera, indirectly in 1238 and directly after 1363. In 1386, Corfu voluntarily became part of Venice's colonies. A century later, Venice captured Zante in 1485, Cephalonia in 1500 and Ithaca in 1503. The conquest was completed in 1718 with the capture of Lefkada. Each of the islands remained part of the Venetian Stato da Màr until Napoleon Bonaparte dissolved the Republic of Venice in 1797, annexing Corfu. The Ionian Islands are situated in the Ionian Sea, off the west coast of Greece. Cythera, the southernmost, is just off the southern tip of the Peloponnese and Corfu, the northernmost, is located at the entrance of the Adriatic Sea. In modern Greek, the period of Venetian rule over Greek territory is known as Venetokratia or Enetokratia ( or ) and literally means "rule of the Venetians". It is believed that the Venetian period on the Ionian Islands was agreeable, especially compared with the coinciding Tourkokratia — Turkish rule over the remainder of present-day Greece.

The governor of the Ionian Islands during the Venetian period was the Provveditore generale da Mar, who resided on Corfu. Additionally, each island's authorities were divided into the Venetian and the domestic authorities. The economy of the islands was based on exporting local goods, primarily raisins, olive oil and wine, whereas Venetian lira, the currency of Venice, was also the currency of the islands. Some features of the culture of Venice were incorporated in the culture of the Ionian Islands, thus influencing to this day local music, cuisine and language.  The Venetian language, for instance, which was introduced on the islands as the official language and was adopted by the upper class, is still popular today throughout the islands.

Relations between Venice and Byzantium 

Venice was founded in 421 after the destruction of nearby communities by the Huns and the Lombards. In the shifting Italian borders of the following centuries, Venice benefited from remaining under the control of the Roman Empire - increasingly as the furthest Northwestern outpost of the now Constantinople centered power. During Justinian I's reconquest of Italy from the Visigoths, Venice was an increasingly important stronghold for the Empire's Exarchate of Ravenna. The political centre of the exarchate, and the most senior military officials of the Empire, were situated in Ravenna. Notwithstanding the election of the first , vassalic evidence such as honours and orders received by the doge from the Emperor implies that Venice was considered part of the Byzantine Empire even after the capture of Ravenna by the Lombards. By 814 Venice functioned as a fully independent republic. Even so, Venice became a partner of the Empire and trading privileges were granted to it by the Emperors via treaties, such as the Byzantine–Venetian Treaty of 1082.

The Fourth Crusade (1202–1204) was initially intended to invade Muslim-controlled areas; instead, the Crusaders attacked the capital of the Byzantine Empire, Constantinople, resulting in the temporary dissolution of the empire and the sack of its capital. As Venice was one of the participants in the Crusade its relations with the Byzantine Empire were strained during this period. Moreover, by styling themselves "Lord of one-quarter and one-eighth of the whole Empire of Romania" after the Crusade, the Doges of Venice contributed to the deterioration of the relations between the two states. Efforts to improve relations, for example through the Nicaean–Venetian Treaty of 1219, proved unsuccessful. A period of friendly relations only followed the Sicilian Vespers in 1282, when Venice, foreseeing the fall of Charles, the French King of Sicily, began forming closer relations with Byzantium. Venice had been bound by an alliance with Charles against Byzantium in 1281.

Appellation 

The Islands were referred to, both individually and collectively, by various names. After Venice captured Cephalonia on 24 December 1500, the administration of the defense of all the islands was delegated to an official seated in Corfu. This official was being referred to as "the General  of the Three Islands" and resided at the fortress of Angelokastro from 1387 to the end of the 16th century. The Three Islands refer to Corfu, Zante and Cephalonia.

Below are the seven principal islands from north to south, including their Greek and Italian names in parentheses:

 Corfu
 Paxos
 Lefkada (or )
 Cephalonia ( or)
 Zante (or ), see the long account here
 Cythera

History

Roman and Byzantine period 
During the Roman Empire, the Ionian Islands were variously part of the provinces of Achaea and Epirus vetus. These would form, with the exception of Cythera, the Byzantine theme of Cephallenia in the late 8th century. From the late 11th century, the Ionian Islands became a battleground in the Byzantine–Norman Wars. The island of Corfu was held by the Normans in 1081–1085 and 1147–1149, while the Venetians unsuccessfully besieged it in 1122–1123. The island of Cephalonia was also unsuccessfully besieged in 1085, but was plundered in 1099 by the Pisans and in 1126 by the Venetians. Finally, Corfu and the rest of the theme, except for Lefkada, were captured by the Normans under William II of Sicily in 1185. Although Corfu was recovered by the Byzantines by 1191, the other islands henceforth remained lost to Byzantium, and formed a County palatine of Cephalonia and Zakynthos under William's Greek admiral Margaritus of Brindisi.

The  
Corfu passed in the hands of the Despotate of Epirus around 1214, and was captured in 1257 by Manfred of Sicily, who put his admiral Philippe Chinard there in charge of his eastern possessions. Nonetheless, with the defeat of Manfred at Benevento and the signature of the Treaty of Viterbo on 27 May 1267, Corfu became a possession of the Angevin Kingdom of Naples. Meanwhile, the rest of the islands continued to form part of the County palatine, which throughout its existence was governed by three families: the Orsini (whose relation to the Roman Orsini family is unattested), the House of Anjou and the Tocco family. The rule of the family of Tocco lasted for 122 years, up until 1479, when Ottomans captured Cephalonia, Zante, Lefkada and Ithaca.

The Venetian conquest 
On 13 February 1386 Corfu became once more a Venetian possession and this time Venetian rule would last until the end of the Republic. This was accomplished voluntary by the people of Corfu. On 10 May, the Corfiotes appointed five ambassadors to submit to the Venetian senate. The Ottomans made several attempts to capture Corfu, the first of which was in 1537. This attack led Venice to an alliance with the Pope and Emperor Charles V, known as the Holy League, against the Ottoman Empire. Another major unsuccessful Ottoman attack was that of July 1716.

After the partition of the Byzantine Empire in 1204, Cythera fell into Venetian hands in 1238 through the marriage of Marco Venier with the daughter of the Greek lord of the island. With the Treaty of Passarowitz Cythera and Anticythera passed to the Venetian Republic and remained under its control until its fall, in 1797.

The Turkish rule in the three islands of Cephalonia, Zante and Ithaca was short-lived. In 1481, two years after the beginning of the Turkish rule, Antonio Tocco invaded and briefly occupied Cephalonia and Zante but he was soon driven out by the Venetians. Zante was officially recovered by the Venetians in 1485. Finally, Ithaca, following the fate of Cephalonia, was conquered by Venice in 1503.

Ithaca had become depopulated and rewilded during the period of Turkish rule. In 1504, the Venetians ordered official the repopulation of Ithaca with tax incentives to attract settlers from neighbouring islands. The Venetian authorities found the island was already being repopulated by members of the Galatis family, who laid claim to it as their property, having received rights over Ithaca under the Tocco regime.

Lefkada, part of the Despotate of Epirus since the latter's foundation in 1205, was incorporated by Leonardo I Tocco into the County of Cephalonia in 1362. The Despotate of Epirus was one of the three Byzantine Empires in exile created after the Fourth Crusade in 1204. Following the fate of the other central Ionian Islands, it was captured by the Turks in 1479 and then by the Venetians in 1502. However, Venetian rule did not last, as Lefkada was given back to the Ottoman Empire one year later. Turkish rule over Lefkada lasted for over 200 years, from 1479 to 1684, when Francesco Morosini attacked and subdued the island during the Morean War. Lefkada, however, did not become officially Venetian until 1718, with the signature of the Treaty of Passarowitz.

Dissolution of the Republic and aftermath 

Napoleon Bonaparte declared war against Venice on 3 May 1797. The signing of the Treaty of Campo Formio, on 17 October 1797, marked the dissolution of the Republic of Venice and the sharing of its territories between France and Austria. The lands of the  up to the River Adige, the city itself and the possessions of the Balkan peninsula of Istria and Dalmatia were yielded to Austria. The Ionian Islands, part of Venetian maritime territories, were ceded to France. The first included the islands of Corfu and Paxos, as well as the former Venetian settlements of Butrint and Parga situated in Epirus. The second department was formed by the islands of Cephalonia, Ithaca and Lefkada and the cities of Preveza and Vonitsa, whereas Zante and Cerigo were part of the third department. The French rule, however, did not last as Russia allied with the Ottoman Empire in September 1798 and in 1799 a Russo-Ottoman naval expedition captured the islands. With the signing of a treaty between Russia and the Porte on 21 March 1800, an independent island republic under the protection of both the empires was established. The name of the new state was agreed to be the "Septinsular Republic" and included all the territories of the three former French departments except for the continental possessions of Parga, Preveza, Vonitsa and Butrint. With the Treaty of Tilsit in 1807, the seven islands were given back to France by Russia. In October 1809, the United Kingdom took possession of all the islands with the exception of Corfu and Paxos, which was only surrendered in 1814. In 1815, the Ionian Islands became a British protectorate under the name United States of the Ionian Islands.

Administration 

In wartime, due to his absence at the head of the fleet, he was sometimes replaced by a Provveditore generale delle Tre Isole ("Superintendent general of the Three Islands"), referring to Corfu, Zante, and Cephalonia. As a result of the two prolonged wars of the 17th century—the War of Candia (1645–1669) and the Morean War (1684–1699)—the office acquired a more permanent nature, and was renamed to Provveditore generale delle Quattro Isole after the capture of Santa Maura in 1684.

Authorities in the islands were divided into two types: the Venetian ones, occupied by Venetians and represented the sovereign state and its political and military power over the Islands, and the domestic authorities, which were appointed by the Communal Council. The Venetians were appointed by the Great Council of Venice. The title could only be held by a nobleman. The s responsibilities also included security from hostile raids, taxation, religious and other issues.

In Cephalonia and Zante there were only one  and two .

There were ten fortresses throughout the islands, with one on each island serving as its capital. On Corfu, however, there were three fortresses; two in the town of Corfu and the Angelokastro. On Cephalonia there were two, the castle of St. George or the Fortress of Cephalonia and the Fortress of Asso in the northern part.

Economy 

The Ionian economy during the Venetian period was largely based on exporting local products. The most important of the agricultural products of Corfu was olive oil. On the islands of Cephalonia and Zante the main exports were raisins, olive oil and wine. One of the most significant exports was olive oil. Groves of olive trees were planted throughout the islands during the Venetian period as olive oil was important to Venice's economy. Although the production of it was successful, the Republic only allowed exportation to Venice. Statistics for the years 1766–70 indicate 1,905,917 olive trees on Corfu, 113,161 on Zante, 38,516 on Cephalonia, 44,146 on Lefkada and 31,884 on Cythera.

Nevertheless, raisin exports were the most important export of the islands during the Venetian rule. By the early 18th century Zante, Cephalonia, and part of Ithaca had become a major centre of the currant trade. Because of the fierce competition in the raisin trade between Venice and the United Kingdom, Venice prohibited the free export of raisins from the islands.

The currency of the islands during Venetian rule was the Venetian lira, as in Venice. There was a special issue for the Islands; the observe side of it has the complete or shortened inscription CORFU/CEFALONIA/ZANTE in three lines. The reserve depicts the winged and haloed lion of Saint Marc in a front view, holding the book of the Gospel in his fore-paws. The Ionian Islands formed part of the Venetian maritime trade route to the Orient.

Demographics 
When the central Ionian Islands were captured by Venice their population was very low and Ithaca was completely uninhabited. To address this problem, a small colonisation to the islands took place. The population eventually increased: in 1765–66 it had reached 111,439; in 1780, the population was 150,908. Fourteen years later, there were 155,770 inhabitants throughout the islands.

These are some figures concerning the population of each island during the Venetian period:

Language and education 
During the Venetian period all public acts were drawn up in the Venetian language, the official language of the Government. Greek remained spoken by the peasantry whereas Venetian was adopted by the upper class and it was generally preferred within the towns (like in Corfu city, where nearly all the population spoke the Veneto de Mar). Thus, the Venetian language became, if not the common language of the Ionians, at least the prestigious language. The Venetians did little in the area of education, mainly due to the fact that schooling was not considered a responsibility of the state at that time in Europe but a private matter. Some authors believe that this was done intentionally by Venice, as part of its colonial policy. People belonging to the upper classes were more likely to be educated and to have studied at an Italian university, usually the University of Padua. Modelled after the academies operating at that time in Venice, the first literary academy, was founded in Corfu in 1656 by individuals. It had as an emblem two rocks beneath a winged lion, with an inscription  hovering in the air.

Religion 

Venetians, being Catholics, retained the privileges enjoyed by the Latin bishopric of the islands under the Count Palatine dynasties. The Catholics were not numerous, and during the Venetian period, they were mainly concentrated in Corfu and Cephalonia. Most of them were descendants of Italian settlers but there were some conversions by Greeks to Catholicism. According to the law, Greek Orthodox priests and monks had to accept the Catholics as their superiors, though the Venetians placed the interests of the Republic ahead of those of the Papacy. Mixed marriages between Catholic and Orthodox Christians were allowed. These two were the main factors in the decline of Roman Catholicism in the Islands.

Jews were also a native religious group to the Islands during the Venetian period. They were even fewer in number than the Catholics; in 1797 the number of Jews in Corfu appears to have been only two thousand. Jewish presence in Corfu can be traced since the times of the Principality of Taranto. In Cephalonia, there is evidence of Jewish habitation in the old capital, the Castle of St. George, since the early 17th century. When the capital of the island was transferred to Argostoli the Jews resettled there.

Social structure 
The social structure of the islands followed that of Venice. The whole population was divided into three classes: the nobles, the bourgeoisie and the common people.

Legacy 

Across formerly Venetian-owned Greek territory, particularly the Ionian Islands, the memory of the Republic lives on in the social consciousness of the local population with a sentiment of nostalgia despite its troubled history. The sheer duration of the Venetian period has shaped modern-day Heptanesian culture into an amalgamate of its Greek and Italian heritage in all aspects of everyday life. In 1800 the Septinsular Republic was established; its flag design was based on the flag of the Republic of Venice. In addition, Italian was the co-official language of both the Septinsular Republic and the United States of the Ionian Islands. Because of its status, Italian was also taught in schools alongside Greek and English (the Ionian Islands were a protectorate of the United Kingdom from 1815 until 1864). In the first year of secondary education, for instance, Greek was taught four times a week, Italian three times and English twice. In the 1907 Greek census, 4,675 people from the Ionian Islands stated Catholicism as their denomination, about 1.8% of the total population (254,494). At the same time, 2,541 Ionians (1.0%) gave Italian as their mother tongue, making it the second most frequent language by number of speakers. The Italian language remains popular on the islands. The Hellenic Union of Heptanesians, a civil non-profit organization working to promote Septinsular culture, objected to the Ministry's decision to abolish the teaching of Italian in schools, arguing that students had a "right to be taught the language they wish, and especially Italian" as "the preferred language in the Ionian Islands and beyond". They defend its place on the regional curriculum as "a tradition" and deem it "necessary (…) owing to the scale of Italian tourism as well as other, e.g. cultural and commercial ties with the country".

These cultural remnants of the Venetian period were the pretext of Mussolini's desire to incorporate the Ionian Islands into the Kingdom of Italy. Even before the outbreak of World War II and the Greek-Italian War, Mussolini had expressed his wish to annex the Ionian Islands as part of his wider plans for an Italian Empire centered around the Mediterranean Sea. On 15 October, in a meeting in the Palazzo Venezia, he made the final decision to invade Greece. His initial goal was the occupation of Corfu, Zante and Cephalonia. After the fall of Greece, in early April 1941, the invaders divided its lands into three occupation zones; the Italians occupied much of the country, including the Ionians. Mussolini informed General Carlo Geloso that the Ionian Islands would form a separate Italian province through a  annexation, but the Germans would not approve it. The Italian authorities nevertheless continued to prepare the ground for the annexation. Finally, on 22 April 1941, after discussions between the German and Italian rulers, German  Adolf Hitler agreed that Italy could proceed with a  annexation of the islands. From then on, until the end of the war, the islands passed through a phase of Italianization in all areas, from their administration to their economy.

See also 

 Coinage of the Republic of Venice
 Corfiot Italians
 History of the Republic of Venice
 Ionian School of literature
 Ionian School of music
 Ionian School of painting
 Ottoman wars in Europe
 Stato da Màr
 Timeline of the Republic of Venice
 Bailo

References

Footnotes

Bibliography 

 
 
 
 
 
 
 
 
 
 
 
 
 
 
 
 
 
 
 
 
 
 
 
 
 
 
 
 
 
 
 
 
 
 
 
 
 
 
 
 
 
 
 
 
 
 
 
 
 
 
 
 
 
 
 
 
 
 
 
 
 
 
 
 
 
 
 
 
 
 
 
 
 
 
 
 
 
 
 
 
 
 
 
 
 
 
 

 
Stato da Màr
Ionian Islands